M. K. Purushothaman (died June 10, 2013) was an Indian politician, who was Kerala MLA for Njarackal (2006–2011).

Death
Purushothaman died of a heart attack on June 10, 2013.

References

Members of the Kerala Legislative Assembly
Year of birth missing
2013 deaths